Movie Days is a 1994 Icelandic film directed by Friðrik Þór Friðriksson. The film was selected as the Icelandic entry for the Best Foreign Language Film at the 67th Academy Awards, but was not accepted as a nominee.

See also
 List of submissions to the 67th Academy Awards for Best Foreign Language Film
 List of Icelandic submissions for the Academy Award for Best Foreign Language Film

References

External links
 

1994 films
Icelandic drama films
1990s Icelandic-language films
Films directed by Friðrik Þór Friðriksson
Films scored by Hilmar Örn Hilmarsson
Films produced by Peter Aalbæk Jensen
1994 drama films